Beran (also Romanized as Berān; also known as Bīrān) is a village in Baryaji Rural District, in the Central District of Sardasht County, West Azerbaijan Province, Iran. At the 2006 census, its population was 114, in 22 families.

References 

Populated places in Sardasht County